Odessa Sea is a novel by Clive Cussler and Dirk Cussler published November 15, 2016.

Summary
A Dutch entrepreneur, Martin Hendriks, hires the crew of the Crimea-based salvage ship Besso to steal a load of uranium from a black market dealer. They accomplish this by detonating a charge underwater ahead of the target ship, releasing a cloud of poison gas that suffocates the crew of the ship carrying the uranium. He aims to try and sell it to the Iranians in return for 12 missiles, which he will give to the Ukrainian government to use to their war against Russia. He hates the Russians because his wife was killed when the Russian military shot down a commercial airliner in the skies of Ukraine. Dirk Pitt responds to a mayday call from the ship. When he arrives, the ship is blown up by the thugs.

With the help of Europol agent Ana, the uranium is recovered safely. Hendricks then hires the crew of the Besso to set off 20 tons of explosives in waters near the Russian naval base in Sevastopol. They hijack the NUMA ship Macedonia to make the attempt look like it had been attempted by the Americans, so as to start a war between the two great powers. The attempt fails when Dirk Pitt stops the ship.

Next, the crew of the Besso finds an old Russian bomber wreck in the Black Sea, a Tupolev Tu-4 carrying an intact RDS-5 atomic bomb. In the meantime, Dirk and his friend Giordino find the wreck of the Ottoman frigate Fethiye with the preserved body of an airman snagged on the wreck by his parachute. They find evidence that the bomber's payload has recently been removed.  This, along with a raid on the Besso'''s base that finds a cargo door matching the downed bomber, puts them on the trail of Hendricks' plot. Hendricks once again hires the crew of the Besso after upgrading the bomb, this time instructing them to launch an attack on America, making it look like the Russians had done it, to start a war between Russia and United States. Dirk and Giordino find the barge carrying the bomb in Chesapeake Bay; they realize that Hendricks wants to sink the bomb in the bay and then detonate it, releasing a cloud of poison gas over Baltimore. Their helicopter is shot down, but they are rescued by the USS Constellation, a preserved Civil War era sloop-of-war. The volunteers on the ship use shells from the display cases on the ship to fire on the barge with a 20-pounder Parrott rifle on the stern rail at point-blank range. The Constellation is almost destroyed by multiple grenades fired from an RPG. Pitt and Giordino board the barge with swords and defeat the surviving terrorists.

After his attack fails, Hendricks tries one last ploy to harm Russia. Hendricks made his fortune by creating military drones. During a demonstration for the Russian President, he fires a missile at the President, pretending that it is part of the demonstration. His last words before he and the president are blown to pieces are “Mr. President, I am about to kill you in the same manner you killed my family in the skies over Ukraine.”

References to real history and current science in the book
The USS Constellation is a real ship-of-line that served in the American Civil War. It was the last sail-only warship built for the United States Navy and is preserved on Chesapeake Bay.  The Tupolev Tu-4 was a real aircraft, and the RDS-5 atomic bomb did exist. The Ottoman frigate Fethiye may have existed, and there was a large ship-of-line called the Fethiye'' built in 1827. A mention of the General Atomics MQ-9 Reaper military drone is made by Hendricks when he is demonstrating a drone to a Russian general. The drone that Hendriks is marketing, the Peregrine, has various technologies such as a hydrogen fuel cell, solar panels, and radar-absorbent material that exist today, although they have never been used in a drone.

Locations
 Black Sea
 Bergen, Norway
 London, England
 Bermuda
 Bulgaria
 Italy
 Gibraltar
 Washington, DC
 Baltimore, Maryland

Reception
Reception was generally positive, with Kirkus Reviews saying it "gives fans their money’s worth," and Publishers Weekly saying "the pages whip by."

References

2016 American novels
Novels by Clive Cussler
G. P. Putnam's Sons books
Dirk Pitt novels
Collaborative novels